Soceni may refer to several villages in Romania:

 Soceni, a village in Ezeriș Commune, Caraș-Severin County
 Soceni, a village in Tălpaș Commune, Dolj County